Santa Rosa del Abuná is a small town in Pando Department, Bolivia. It is the capital of the department's Abuná Province. It has a population of 232 in 2012.

References

Populated places in Pando Department